Łosośniki may refer to the following places in Poland:
Łosośniki, Pomeranian Voivodeship (north Poland)
Łosośniki, Kuyavian-Pomeranian Voivodeship (north-central Poland)